Tokyo DisneySea is a theme park  in Urayasu, Chiba, Japan, just outside Tokyo. This is a list of current and past attractions – rides, shows, restaurants, and shops – that have appeared at the park. Character meets and atmosphere entertainment (e.g., roving musicians) are not listed. Also not listed are attractions from the neighboring Tokyo Disneyland.

Mediterranean Harbor 

 Fortress Explorations
 DisneySea Transit Steamer Line
 Venetian Gondolas
 Soaring: Fantastic Flight

Mysterious Island 

 Journey to the Center of the Earth
 20,000 Leagues Under the Sea

Mermaid Lagoon 

 Flounder's Flying Fish Coaster
 Scuttle's Scooters
 Jumpin' Jellyfish
 Blowfish Balloon Race
 The Whirlpool
 Mermaid Lagoon Theater
 Ariel's Greeting Grotto
 Parque La Marimba

Former attractions 
 Mermaid Lagoon Theater
Under the Sea (2001-2014)
King Triton's Concert (2015-2020)

Arabian Coast 

 The Magic Lamp Theater
 Caravan Carousel
 Sindbad's Storybook Voyage
 Jasmine's Flying Carpets

Former Attractions 
 Sindbad's Seven Voyages

Lost River Delta 

 Indiana Jones Adventure: Temple of the Crystal Skull
 Raging Spirits
 DisneySea Transit Steamer Line

Port Discovery 

 Aquatopia
 DisneySea Electric Railway
 Nemo & Friends SeaRider

Former attractions 
 StormRider

American Waterfront 

 Toy Story Mania!
 Tower of Terror
 Big City Vehicles
 DisneySea Electric Railway
 Turtle Talk
 DisneySea Transit Steamer Line

Fantasy Springs 

On June 14, 2018, The Oriental Land Company announced that Tokyo DisneySea would be expanding. An eighth "port" will be added to the seven themed ports currently in the park. The eighth port will be themed to "magical springs that lead to a world of Disney fantasy and will include four new attractions." It will be themed around the Disney films Frozen, Tangled, and Peter Pan. A new deluxe hotel with a one-of-a-kind luxury wing will also be connected to the port. On May 21, The Oriental Land Company announced that new port is officially named "Fantasy Springs".

 Frozen Kingdom (Opening in 2024)
 Peter Pan's Never Land (Opening in 2024)
 Rapunzel's Forest (Opening in 2024)

References

Tokyo DisneySea

Disney